Out Of The Unknown: Brisbane Bands 1976–1988 is a comprehensive guide on Brisbane bands from 1976 to 1988, compiled by Doug Hutson and Gavin Sawford, and published by Time Off in 1988. The book features an A-Z band listing, discographies and interviews. The cover has a photo of The Go-Betweens with a surrounding artwork depicting musical instruments. Gavin Sawford was at one time the editor of Time Off.

See also
 Time Off
 Popular entertainment in Brisbane

Culture of Brisbane
Books about Australian music